Macrostylidae is a family of crustaceans belonging to the order Isopoda.

Genera:
 Desmostylis Brandt, 1992	 
 Macrostylis Sars, 1864

References

Isopoda